Stonewall Gap (also known as Stonewall) is an unincorporated community and a census-designated place (CDP) located in and governed by Las Animas County, Colorado, United States. The population of the Stonewall Gap CDP was 67 at the United States Census 2010. The Weston post office (Zip Code 81091) serves the area.

Geography
Stonewall Gap lies along Colorado State Highway 12 at a gap formed by the Middle Fork of the Purgatoire River through the  elevation Stonewall Ridge. Highway 12 leads east down the Purgatoire River valley  to Trinidad, the Las Animas county seat, and north over Cucharas Pass in the Sangre de Cristo Mountains  to La Veta.

Demographics

See also

Outline of Colorado
Index of Colorado-related articles
State of Colorado
Colorado cities and towns
Colorado census designated places
Colorado counties
Las Animas County, Colorado

References

External links

Stonewall @ UncoverColorado.com
Las Animas County website

Census-designated places in Las Animas County, Colorado
Census-designated places in Colorado